

Roster

Results

Standings

Statistics

References

Ryukyu Golden Kings seasons